Hinata Watanabe (born August 26, 1986 in Hiratsuka), or HINATA, is a Japanese welterweight kickboxer fighting out of Hiratsuka, Japan for the Shonan Kakuto Club.  He is the 2008 R.I.S.E. champion currently competing in R.I.S.E. and K-1 MAX.

Biography and career
Hinata made his pro debut with RISE at the G-Bazooka Tournament event in 2005 losing in a non-tournament match.  Over the next couple of years he had a fairly unspectacular fight record on the local circuit winning nine and losing six between 2005 and 2007.  He had his first taste of success in 2008 winning a playoff at R.I.S.E. 46  to earn himself a shot at the organizations middleweight title, against a fighter who had defeated Hinata the previous year, at R.I.S.E. 48.  This time Hinata would have his revenge, beating Ryuji to win the R.I.S.E. middleweight title -70 kg.  As champion he had an additional bonus - qualifying for the following year's K-1 MAX Japan tournament – as R.I.S.E. was a feeder for the larger K-1 organization.

In 2009 Hinata entered the annual K-1 World MAX Japan tournament with the victor having a chance at qualification for the K-1 World MAX final later that year.  Hinata caused an upset by defeating the reigning K-1 MAX Japan champion Yasuhiro Kido by decision in the quarter finals.  This victory did, however, come at a cost, with the young fighter being unable to continue in the tournament due to a broken nose suffered in the win.  His performances at the K-1 MAX Japan lead to him being called up for a super fight at the K-1 World MAX 2009 Final 8 where he lost to The Contender Asia Series 1 fighter Dzhabar Askerov.  He made a further appearance for K-1 before the end of the year at the K-1 World MAX 2009 Final in another super fight, this time shocking MAX regular and multiple world champion Mike Zambidis by taking a unanimous victory.

By now a well known face on the local circuit Hinata re-entered the K-1 World MAX Japan 2010 where he caused another upset by defeating 2009 K-1 World MAX semi finalist Yuya Yamamoto in the quarter finals, only to suffer a KO defeat to fellow up and coming fighter Hiroki Nakajima in less than a minute of their semi final bout.  This defeat meant that Hinata would miss out on qualification for the MAX final and showed that he still had some work to do.  In his very next fight Hinata burst on to the global scene where he upset top five middleweight fighter and heavy favourite Artur Kyshenko with a spectacular crescent kick TKO.  The victory meant that Hinata moved up to 12 in the international middleweight division rankings on HeadkickLegend in their October 2010 rankings.

He lost to Warren Stevelmans via unanimous decision (30-28, 28-27 and 29-28) at Shootboxing 2012 - Act 4 on September 17, 2012 in Tokyo, Japan, failing to qualify for the 2012 S-Cup.

Hinata knocked out Norihisa Amimoto in round two at REBELS.13 on October 28, 2012.

He rematched Andy Ristie in a reserve bout at the Shoot Boxing World Tournament 2012 in Tokyo, Japan on November 17, 2012 and lost by TKO in the first round once again.

He beat Masatoshi Hyakutake by unanimous decision at Shoot Boxing 2013 - Act 1 in Tokyo on February 22, 2013.

He defeated Takuma Konishi via unanimous decision for the vacant REBELS BLACK Super Welterweight Championship at REBELS 15 in Tokyo on April 14, 2013.

He knocked out Kanai Kenji with a second round high kick at Shootboxing 2013 - Act 3 in Tokyo on June 23, 2013.

He stopped Johann Fauveau with low kicks in round three at Glory 10: Los Angeles - Middleweight World Championship Tournament in Ontario, California, United States on September 28, 2013.

He defeated Josh Jauncey by unanimous decision at Shoot Boxing Battle Summit Ground Zero Tokyo 2013 in Tokyo, Japan on November 15, 2013.

Titles 
REBELS
 2013 REBELS BLACK Super Welterweight Championship (1 title defence)
RISE
 2008 RISE Middleweight (-70kg) Champion

Awards
eFight.jp
2x Fighter of the Month (September 2015, February 2018)

Kickboxing record

|-  style="background:#cfc;"
| 2022-03-12|| Win ||align=left| Saksith || KNOCK OUT 2022 vol.2 || Tokyo, Japan || KO (Body shot) || 2 || 1:47 || 50-23
|-
|-  style="background:#fbb;"
| 2021-02-28|| Loss ||align=left| Kaito|| REBELS ～The FINAL～ || Tokyo, Japan || Decision (Majority)  || 3 ||3:00 ||49-23
|-
! style=background:white colspan=9 |
|-  style="background:#cfc;"
| 2020-09-12|| Win ||align=left| Hijiri Tamura || KNOCK OUT CHAMPIONSHIP.2 || Tokyo, Japan || KO (Left Middle Kick) || 1 || 2:49 || 49-22
|-  style="background:#cfc;"
| 2020-02-11 || Win|| align=left| Daniel Marshall|| KNOCK OUT CHAMPIONSHIP.1 || Tokyo, Japan || Decision (Unanimous) || 3 || 3:00 || 48-22
|-  style="background:#cfc;"
| 2019-11-01|| Win ||align=left| Raseasing Weerasakreck  || KNOCK OUT 2019 BREAKING DAWN || Tokyo, Japan || Decision || 5 || 3:00|| 47-22
|-  style="background:#FFBBBB;"
| 2019-08-18|| Loss ||align=left| Jomthong Chuwattana || K.O CLIMAX 2019 SUMMER KICK FEVER || Tokyo, Japan || Decision || 3 || 3:00|| 46-21
|-  style="background:#cfc;"
| 2019-06-09 || Win || align=left| Yuki Sakamoto || REBELS.61 || Tokyo, Japan || Extra Round Decision  || 4 || 3:00|| 46-20
|-  style="background:#cfc;"
| 2019-02-17 || Win || align=left| Sibmean Sitchefboontham || PANCRASE REBELS RING.1|| Tokyo, Japan || KO (Low Kicks) || 3 || 0:26|| 45-20
|-
! style=background:white colspan=9 |
|-  style="background:#cfc;"
| 2018-10-08 || Win || align=left| Tsukuru Midorikawa || REBELS.58 || Tokyo, Japan ||Decision (majority) || 3 || 3:00|| 44-20
|-  style="background:#fbb;"
| 2018-03-21 || Loss || align=left| Chingiz Allazov ||K-1 World GP 2018: K'FESTA.1 || Saitama, Japan || KO (Left Hook) || 2 || 0:23|| 43-20
|-  
! style=background:white colspan=9 |
|-
|-  style="background:#cfc;"
| 2017-12-27|| Win ||align=left| Hirono Yu ||K-1 Survival Wars|| Tokyo, Japan || Decision (Majority) || 3 || 3:00 || 43-19
|-
|-  style="background:#cfc;"
| 2017-09-18|| Win ||align=left| Sergio Sanchez ||K-1 World GP 2016 -67.5kg World Tournament, Superfight|| Tokyo, Japan || Decision (unanimous) || 3 || 3:00 || 42-19
|-  style="background:#fbb;"
| 2017-06-18 || Loss ||align=left| Jordann Pikeur || K-1 World GP 2017 Super Middleweight Championship Tournament, Quarter Finals || Tokyo, Japan || Decision (Unanimous) || 3 ||3:00|| 41-19
|-  style="background:#cfc;"
| 2017-02-25 || Win ||align=left| Shintaro Matsukura || K-1 World GP 2017 Lightweight Championship Tournament || Tokyo, Japan || Decision (Unanimous) || 3 ||3:00|| 41-18
|-  style="background:#cfc;"
| 2016-11-30 || Win || align=left| Akihiro Gono || REBELS.47 || Tokyo, Japan || KO || 2 || 2:43 || 40-18
|-  style="background:#cfc;"
| 2016-08-07 || Win ||align=left| Albert Kraus || Kunlun Fight 49 / Rebels 45 || Tokyo, Japan || Decision (unanimous) || 3 || 3:00 || 39-18
|-  style="background:#cfc;"
| 2016-06-01 || Win || align=left| Redouan Daoudi || REBELS.43 || Tokyo, Japan || Decision  || 3 || 3:00|| 38-18
|-  style="background:#fbb;"
| 2016-03-09 || Loss ||align=left| Mohamed Mezouari || Rebels. 41 || Tokyo, Japan || Decision (Unanimous) || 3 || 3:00 || 37-18
|-  style="background:#cfc;"
| 2015-12-29 || Win ||align=left| Kazuyuki Miyata || Rizin World Grand-Prix 2015:Part 1 - Saraba || Saitama, Japan || TKO (punches) || 1 || 2:15 || 37-17
|-  style="background:#cfc;"
| 2015-09-16 || Win ||align=left| Andy Souwer || Rebels. 38 || Tokyo, Japan || Decision (Unanimous) || 3 || 3:00 || 36-17
|-  style="background:#cfc;"
| 2015-06-14 || Win ||align=left| Vahid Roshani || WSR SUK WEERASAKRECK IX || Japan || Decision (Unanimous) || 3 || 3:00 || 35-17
|-  style="background:#cfc;"
| 2015-03-04 || Win ||align=left| Roman Mailov || Rebels 34 || Tokyo, Japan || Decision (unanimous) || 3 || 3:00 || 34-17
|-  style="background:#cfc;"
| 2014-12-29 || Win ||align=left| Yuichiro Nagashima || Blade 1 || Tokyo, Japan || Decision (Unanimous) || 3 || 3:00 || 33-16

|-  style="background:#cfc;"
| 2014-10-26 || Win ||align=left| Yu Hirono || REBELS.31 || Tokyo, Japan || Decision (Split)  || 5|| 3:00 || 32-16

|-  style="background:#fbb;"
| 2014-07-12 ||Loss ||align=left| Samo Petje || R.I.S.E. 100 -BLADE 0- || Tokyo, Japan || TKO (referee stoppage) || 2 || 2:00 || 31-16
|-  style="background:#cfc;"
| 2014-03-16 || Win ||align=left| Kentaro Hokuto|| REBELS 25 || Tokyo, Japan || KO || 2 || 1:23 || 31-15
|-
! style=background:white colspan=9 |
|-  style="background:#cfc;"
| 2014-01-26 || Win ||align=left| Sijun Jin || REBELS 23 || Tokyo, Japan || Decision (unanimous) || 3 || 3:00 || 31-15
|-  style="background:#cfc;"
| 2013-11-15 || Win ||align=left| Josh Jauncey || Shoot Boxing Battle Summit Ground Zero Tokyo 2013 || Tokyo, Japan || Decision (unanimous) || 3 || 3:00 || 30-15
|-  style="background:#cfc;"
| 2013-09-28 || Win ||align=left| Johann Fauveau || Glory 10: Los Angeles || Ontario, California, USA || TKO (low kicks) || 3 || 0:48 || 29-15
|-  style="background:#cfc;"
| 2013-06-23 || Win ||align=left| Kanai Kenji || Shootboxing 2013 - Act 3 || Tokyo, Japan || KO (left high kick) || 2 || 1:10 || 28-15
|-  style="background:#cfc;"
| 2013-04-14 || Win ||align=left| Takuma Konishi || REBELS.15 || Tokyo, Japan || Decision (unanimous) || 3 || 3:00 || 27-15
|-
! style=background:white colspan=9 |
|-  style="background:#cfc;"
| 2013-02-22 || Win ||align=left| Masatoshi Hyakutake || Shoot Boxing 2013 - Act 1 || Tokyo, Japan || Decision (unanimous) || 3 || 3:00 || 26-15
|-  style="background:#fbb;"
| 2012-11-17 || Loss ||align=left| Andy Ristie || Shoot Boxing World Tournament 2012, Reserve Bout || Tokyo, Japan || TKO (referee stoppage) || 1 || 2:31 || 25-14
|-  style="background:#cfc;"
| 2012-10-28 || Win ||align=left| Norihisa Amimoto || REBELS.13 || Tokyo, Japan || KO (left cross) || 2 || 1:52 || 25-13
|-  style="background:#fbb;"
| 2012-09-19 || Loss ||align=left| Warren Stevelmans || Shootboxing 2012 - Act 4 || Tokyo, Japan || Decision (unanimous) || 3 || 3:00 || 24-13

|-  style="background:#cfc;"
| 2012-07-29 || Win||align=left| Kang Jeong-U || IT’S SHOWTIME JAPAN countdown-2 || Tokyo, Japan || KO (Left high kick) || 1 || 1:24 || 24-12

|-  style="background:#fbb;"
| 2012-06-02 || Loss||align=left| Henri Opstal || RISE 88 || Tokyo, Japan || KO (Right high kick) || 3 || 0:19 || 23-12

|-  style="background:#cfc;"
| 2012-04-15 || Win||align=left| Zen Fujita || REBELS.11 || Tokyo, Japan || TKO (3 Knockdowns) || 2 || 2:42 || 23-11

|-  style="background:#fbb;"
| 2012-01-28 || Loss ||align=left| Andy Ristie || It's Showtime 2012 in Leeuwarden || Leeuwarden, Netherlands || TKO (referee stoppage) || 1 || 1:58 || 22-11
|-  style="background:#cfc;"
| 2011-10-23 || Win ||align=left| Baek Min-Cheol || REBELS.9 & It's Showtime Japan 4 || Tokyo, Japan || KO (Body Kick) || 1 || 1.01 || 22-10
|-  style="background:#fbb;"
| 2011-07-18 || Loss ||align=left| Giorgio Petrosyan || REBELS 8 & It's Showtime Japan 1 || Tokyo, Japan || Decision (Unanimous) || 3 || 3:00 || 21-10
|-  style="background:#cfc;"
| 2011-04-17 || Win||align=left| Danilo Zanolini || SNKA TITANS NEOS IX || Tokyo, Japan || Decision (Unanimous) || 3 || 3:00 ||21-9
|-  style="background:#cfc;"
| 2011-01-23 || Win ||align=left| Woo Yong Choi || REBELS-EX: Hinata's Wave || Tokyo, Japan || KO (Left High Kick) || 3 || 0:15 || 20-9
|-  style="background:#cfc;"
| 2010-11-08 || Win ||align=left| Andre "Dida" Amade || K-1 World MAX 2010 Final, Super Fight || Tokyo, Japan || Decision (Unanimous) || 3 || 3:00 || 19-9
|-  style="background:#fbb;"
| 2010-09-18 || Loss ||align=left| Andy Souwer || Shoot Boxing "Ishin 4" || Tokyo, Japan || KO (Choke) || 1 || 0:48 || 18-9
|-  style="background:#cfc;"
| 2010-07-31 || Win ||align=left| Artur Kyshenko || KRS: "RISE 68" || Tokyo, Japan || TKO (Left Middle Kick) || 3 || 1:23 || 18-8
|-  style="background:#fbb;"
| 2010-03-27 || Loss ||align=left| Hiroki Nakajima || K-1 World MAX 2010 Japan, Semi Finals || Saitama, Japan || KO (Right Hook) || 1 || 0:58 || 17-8
|-  style="background:#cfc;"
| 2010-03-27 || Win ||align=left| Yuya Yamamoto || K-1 World MAX 2010 Japan, Quarter Finals || Saitama, Japan || Decision (Unanimous) || 3 || 3:00 || 17-7
|-  style="background:#cfc;"
| 2010-01-24 || Win ||align=left| Doo Suk Oh || R.I.S.E. 61 || Tokyo, Japan || Decision (Unanimous) || 3 || 3:00 || 16-7
|-  style="background:#cfc;"
| 2009-10-26 || Win ||align=left| Mike Zambidis || K-1 World MAX 2009 Final, Super Fight || Yokohama, Japan || Decision (Unanimous) || 3 || 3:00 || 15-7
|-  style="background:#fbb;"
| 2009-07-13 || Loss ||align=left| Dzhabar Askerov || K-1 World MAX 2009 Final 8, Super Fight || Tokyo, Japan || Ext.R Decision (Unanimous) || 4 || 3:00 || 14-7
|-  style="background:#cfc;"
| 2009-02-23 || Win ||align=left| Yasuhiro Kido || K-1 World MAX 2009 Japan, Quarter Finals || Tokyo, Japan || Ext.R Decision (Unanimous) || 4 || 3:00 || 14-6
|-
! style=background:white colspan=9 |
|-  style="background:#cfc;"
| 2008-11-30 || Win ||align=left| Hayato || R.I.S.E. 51 || Tokyo, Japan || Decision (Unanimous) || 3 || 3:00 || 13-6
|-  style="background:#cfc;"
| 2008-07-04 || Win ||align=left| Ryuji || R.I.S.E. 48 - The King Of Gladiators '08 || Tokyo, Japan || Decision (Unanimous) || 3 || 3:00 || 12-6
|-
! style=background:white colspan=9 |
|-  style="background:#cfc;"
| 2008-05-11 || Win ||align=left| Yasuhito Shirasu || R.I.S.E. 46 - The King Of Gladiators '08 || Tokyo, Japan || Decision (Unanimous) || 3 || 3:00 || 11-6
|-
! style=background:white colspan=9 |
|-  style="background:#cfc;"
| 2008-02-22 || Win ||align=left| Hideki Mizutani || R.I.S.E. -γ- "ROC"  || Japan || Decision (Unanimous) || 3 || 3:00 || 10-6
|-  style="background:#fbb;"
| 2007-12-16 || Loss ||align=left| Ryuji || R.I.S.E. Dead or Alive tournament '07, Semi Finals || Japan || KO (Right Hook) || 2 || 1:40 || 9-6
|-  style="background:#cfc;"
| 2007-12-16 || Win ||align=left| Kenshi || R.I.S.E. Dead or Alive tournament '07, Quarter Finals || Japan || Decision (Unanimous) || 3 || 3:00 || 9-5
|-  style="background:#cfc;"
| 2007-10-28 || Win ||align=left| Mikoto || R.I.S.E. Last Survival '07 || Japan || Decision (Unanimous) || 3 || 3:00 || 8-5
|-  style="background:#cfc;"
| 2007-09-? || Win ||align=left| || Rajadamnern Stadium || Bangkok, Thailand || KO || || || 7-5
|-  style="background:#fbb;"
| 2007-07-22 || Loss ||align=left| Crazy884 || R.I.S.E. 38 || Tokyo, Japan || Ext.R Decision (Unanimous) || 4 || 3:00 || 6-5
|-  style="background:#cfc;"
| 2007-04-29 || Win ||align=left| Hideya Tanaka || R.I.S.E. 35 || Japan || Decision (Unanimous) || 3 || 3:00 || 6-4
|-  style="background:#fbb;"
| 2007-02-11 || Loss ||align=left| Masakazu Watanabe || J-Network "J-Fight 14" tournament, 1st Round || Japan || Decision (Majority) || 3 || 3:00 || 5-4
|-  style="background:#cfc;"
| 2006-12-17 || Win ||align=left| Hiroyuki Owatarti || R.I.S.E. Dead or Alive tournament '06, Opening Fight || Tokyo, Japan || Decision (Unanimous) || 3 || 3:00 || 5-3
|-  style="background:#fbb;"
| 2006-10-29 || Loss ||align=left| Naoki Tashima || R.I.S.E. 30 || Japan || KO (Straight Left) || 1 || 0:38 || 4-3
|-  style="background:#fbb;"
| 2006-09-01 || Loss ||align=left| Koji || J-Network "Mach Go! Go!" Strongest Tournament, 1st Round || Japan || Ext.R Decision (Unanimous) || 4 || 3:00 || 4-2
|-  style="background:#cfc;"
| 2006-05-28 || Win ||align=left| Kenta || R.I.S.E. 26 || Japan || KO (Punch) || 3 || 2:17 || 4-1
|-  style="background:#cfc;"
| 2006-04-16 || Win ||align=left| NIIZUMAX! || J-Network "J-Fight 9" || Japan || Decision (Unanimous) || 3 || 3:00 || 3-1
|-  style="background:#cfc;"
| 2006-01-04 || Win ||align=left| Kino Otaru || A.J.K.F. "New Years Festival" '06, Opening Fight || Japan || KO || 1 || 1:23 || 2-1
|-  style="background:#cfc;"
| 2005-09-18 || Win ||align=left| Motoe Takahashi Nozomi || Trial League 3 || Japan || Decision (Unanimous) || 3 || 3:00 || 1-1
|-  style="background:#fbb;"
| 2005-06-19 || Loss ||align=left| Hideaki Yoshikawa || R.I.S.E. G-Bazooka Tournament '05, Opening Fight || Japan || Decision (Unanimous) || 3 || 3:00 || 0-1
|-
| colspan=9 | Legend:

See also
List of male kickboxers
List of K-1 Events

References

External links
K-1 OFFICIAL WEBSITE | HINATA | FIGHTERS
Official Hinata website (In Japanese)
Shonan Fight Club - Gym Affiliation (In Japanese)
R.I.S.E. Official Website (In Japanese) 
Hinata K-1.de profile

1986 births
Living people
Japanese male kickboxers
Welterweight kickboxers
Sportspeople from Kanagawa Prefecture